Bedipur is a village and Gram panchayat in Bilhaur Tehsil, Kanpur Nagar district, Uttar Pradesh, India. It is located 57 km away from Kanpur City. Village code is 	149968.

References

Villages in Kanpur Nagar district